The men's 30 kilometre classical cross-country skiing competition at the 1998 Winter Olympics in Nagano, Japan, was held on 9 February at Snow Harp. The competitors started with a 30-second interval.

Results
The results:

References

Men's cross-country skiing at the 1998 Winter Olympics
Men's 30 kilometre cross-country skiing at the Winter Olympics